Portonovo Sociedad Deportiva is a Spanish football team based in Portonovo, in the autonomous community of Galicia. Founded in 1948 it plays in Preferente Autonómica – Group Sur, holding home matches at Estadio Baltar, which has a capacity of 5,000 spectators.

Season to season

13 seasons in Tercera División

Notable former players
 Fran Castaño
 Aitor Díaz
 Óscar Guimeráns
 Martelinho
 Lautaro de León

External links
Official website 
Futbolme team profile 

Football clubs in Galicia (Spain)
Association football clubs established in 1948
Divisiones Regionales de Fútbol clubs
1948 establishments in Spain